The 2021 Tennessee Volunteers football team represented the University of Tennessee in the 2021 NCAA Division I FBS football season. The Volunteers played their home games at Neyland Stadium in Knoxville, Tennessee, and competed in the Eastern Division of the Southeastern Conference (SEC). They were led by first-year coach Josh Heupel.

Recruiting class

Coaching staff

Schedule

Game summaries

Bowling Green

Pittsburgh

Tennessee Tech

at No. 11 Florida

at Missouri

vs. South Carolina

No. 13 Ole Miss

The game was delayed for nearly 20 minutes in the 4th quarter as some Tennessee fans started to throw objects onto the field, including a golf ball that hit Ole Miss head coach Lane Kiffin in the leg. The eruption occurred after officials ruled that Tennessee tight end Jacob Warren was short on 4th-and-24 with just under a minute left to play. On the Monday following the game, SEC commissioner Greg Sankey announced that Tennessee would be fined $250,000 due to the fans' actions.

at No. 4 Alabama

at No. 18 Kentucky

No. 1 Georgia

South Alabama

Vanderbilt

Purdue

Players drafted into the NFL

References

Tennessee
Tennessee Volunteers football seasons
Tennessee Volunteers football